Absheron National Park is a national park of Azerbaijan in the Caspian Hyrcanian mixed forests' ecoregion.

Fauna and flora 
The Absheron State Nature Preserve was created in July 1969 in order to protect gazelles, Caspian seals and water birds that inhabit the territory. The climate of the area is semi-arid, specific to semi-desert and dry steppe. Types and phytomass of flora is poor here, plants are changed respective of water and saltiness regime of area. Sea coastal sand plants (42,6%), meadows with jigilgamish and paz grass (13,2 %), one-year saline grasses (5,2 %) etc. are spread. Ephemeras also develop well in early spring.

List of fauna 

 In dry area gazelle, jackal, fox, rabbit, badger, in Caspian waters seal and various fishes, birds such as silver gull, wheezing swan, grey and red-headed black, white-eyed black ducks, big white bittern, sandpiper, bald-coot, marsh belibagli, sea bozcha and other migrant birds have inhabited here.
 The eastern point of the Asiatic lion's range in the Trans-Caucasus was Absheron Peninsula, before the end of the 10th century.
 The Caspian tiger used to invade Apsheron Peninsula from the Talysh Mountains and Lankaran Lowland, before disappearing in the 20th century.
 The Caucasian leopard, lynx, and striped hyena were reported in this area.

See also 
 Nature of Azerbaijan
 National Parks of Azerbaijan
 State Reserves of Azerbaijan
 List of protected areas of Azerbaijan

References

External links
 Absheron National Park Official Website - Ministry of Ecology and Natural Resources of Azerbaijan 
 National Parks: Absheron National Park - Ministry of Ecology and Natural Resources of Azerbaijan 

IUCN Category II
National parks of Azerbaijan
Protected areas established in 2005
2005 establishments in Azerbaijan